St. Xavier's is a school in Adipur, Kachchh District, India, founded in July 1983. The school is managed by the Catholic minority trust, Kutch Kelwani Mandal. The school's motto is "For God and for Man". The school houses classes from kindergarten to XII (science and commerce) taught through in English and kindergarten to X taught in Gujarati. There are more than 3500 students and more than 100 teachers.

References

Christian schools in Gujarat
Education in Kutch district
Educational institutions established in 1983
1983 establishments in Gujarat